Pennsylvania Railroad 4859 is a GG1-class electric locomotive located in the Harrisburg Transportation Center in Harrisburg in the U.S. state of Pennsylvania. It was operated by the Pennsylvania Railroad and its successors, Penn Central and Conrail. 4859 pulled the first electrically powered train from Philadelphia to Harrisburg on January 15, 1938. It was used in various freight and passenger service until November 22, 1979, when it pulled the last GG1-powered freight train on November 22, 1979. Originally located in Strasburg, it was listed on the National Register of Historic Places in 1982 and was moved to its current location in 1986. It was designated the state electric locomotive of Pennsylvania in 1987 by the Pennsylvania General Assembly and was re-listed on the National Register of Historic Places in 2004.

Background
The GG1 was developed in 1930s by General Electric as the replacement for the Pennsylvania Railroad's then standard electric locomotive, the P5a, and was based largely on the New Haven EP3. The prototype GG1, PRR 4800, was tested against Westinghouse's submission, the R1. The Pennsylvania selected the GG1 over the R1, as the R1 was not articulated and the GG1's traction motors were similar to ones already in use. An order for 57 GG1s was placed in November 1934 and the first locomotives were delivered in April 1935.

Raymond Loewy was hired by the Pennsylvania to "enhance the GG1's aesthetics." Loewy had the production locomotives' bodies be welded together, instead of riveted the way 4800 was, to give the GG1 a more streamlined appearance. Loewy also formulated the Brunswick green paint scheme and the gold pinstripes, nicknamed "cat's whiskers", which was eventually applied by the Pennsylvania to all of its locomotives for the next 20 years.

History
4859 was built in December 1937 at the Pennsylvania Railroad's Altoona Works in Altoona, Pennsylvania. The electrified Philadelphia–Harrisburg line was opened on January 15, 1938, with 4859 pulling the inaugural train, Train #25 The Metropolitan. Its departure from Philadelphia was accompanied by a cacophony of various train whistles and fire sirens leading some residents, who were unaware of the event, to believe that Nazi Germany was invading.

4859 was regeared to have a top speed of  when it was shifted to freight duty in 1964. Although used primarily for freight, 4859 continued to pull "Clockers", short-haul passenger trains from New York to Philadelphia, and commuter trains on the New York and Long Branch Railroad. 4859, accompanied by PRR 4887, pulled the last freight train to be powered by a GG1 from the Enola Yard in Enola, Pennsylvania, to Edgemoor, Delaware, before being retired by Conrail on November 29, 1979.

Preservation

After its retirement, 4859 was purchased in for $13,000 by the Harrisburg chapter of the National Railroad Historical Society and donated to the Harrisburg Redevelopment Authority. It was sent to the Pennsylvania Railroad Museum in Strasburg in the early 1980s, where restoration of 4859 was carried by the workshops of the nearby Strasburg Rail Road. The body and chassis were sandblasted, primed and repainted back to its original 1938 appearance. The main transformer was removed and drained of the hazardous polychlorinated biphenyl (PCB) used as coolant.

4859 was listed on the National Register of Historic Places on August 19, 1982, while still in Strasburg. The deed to 4859 was transferred from Redevelopment Authority to the Pennsylvania Historical and Museum Commission on November 13, 1986. Two days later, the engine was moved into the Transportation Center and rededicated. The Pennsylvania General Assembly designated 4859 the official state electric locomotive on December 18, 1987, while also designating two K4s locomotives as the state steam locomotives in the same bill. 4859 was listed on National Register of Historic Places for a second time on May 5, 2004. "Soft" materials, like insulation, were removed from the cab in 2005 on orders from the United States Environmental Protection Agency to remove residual contamination from the PCBs. In 2010, 4859 received some cosmetic restoration of its truck assemblies which were re-painted black to eliminate a noticeable coating of rust. By October 17, 2015, the renovations were complete enough to allow 4859 to return to the station, though the project overall remains in progress.

See also

 List of Pennsylvania state symbols
 National Register of Historic Places listings in Dauphin County, Pennsylvania

Notes

Footnotes

References
 
 
 

11 kV AC locomotives
2-C+C-2 locomotives
Individual locomotives of the United States
Landmarks in Harrisburg, Pennsylvania
4859
Preserved electric locomotives
Railway locomotives on the National Register of Historic Places in Pennsylvania
Symbols of Pennsylvania
Standard gauge locomotives of the United States
National Register of Historic Places in Harrisburg, Pennsylvania